Diana Noonan (born 7 January 1960) is a New Zealand children's author. In 2022 she was awarded the Storylines Margaret Mahy Medal for her outstanding contributions to New Zealand literature for young people.

Biography
Noonan was born in Dunedin and attended Waihola Primary School and Tokomairiro High School. She completed a degree in English at the University of Otago in 1980. She completed a teaching diploma the following year and began her career as a teacher. She taught in secondary schools for four years then became a full-time writer. Noonan was Writer in Residence at the Dunedin College of Education in 1993, and was the editor of the New Zealand School Journal for eight years.

Following the 2011 Christchurch earthquake Noonan wrote a children's picture book, Quaky Cat, about a cat's experience of the earthquakes. She donated all royalties to the Christchurch earthquake appeal, raising over $150,000. She and the book's illustrator Gavin Bishop received the North West Christchurch Award 2012 in appreciation of her donation.

Awards and recognition

References

1960 births
Living people
University of Otago alumni
People educated at Tokomairiro High School
Writers from Dunedin
New Zealand children's writers